2008 Hungaroring GP2 Series round was the seventh round of the 2008 GP2 Series season. It was held on August 2 and August 3, 2008 at Hungaroring in Mogyoród, Pest, Hungary. The race was used as a support race to the 2008 Hungarian Grand Prix.

Classification

Qualifying

Feature race

Sprint race

References

Hungarian
GP2